The discography for American country music singer Merle Haggard includes 66 studio albums, five instrumental albums featuring his backing band the Strangers, as well as several live and compilation albums.  Haggard recorded for a variety of major and independent record labels through the years, with significant years spent with Capitol Records (where he lived for over a decade), MCA Records, Epic Records and Curb Records, as well as his own label Hag Records.

Studio albums

1960s

1970s

1980s

1990s

2000s

2010s

Instrumental albums
{| class="wikitable plainrowheaders" style="text-align:center;"
|-
! rowspan="2" style="width:35em;"| Title
! rowspan="2" style="width:20em;"| Album details
! colspan="1"| Peakchartposition
|- style="font-size:smaller;"
! width="45"| US Country
|-
! scope="row"| The Instrumental Sounds of Merle Haggard's Strangers 
| 
 Release date: February 23, 1969
 Label: Capitol
| 36
|-
! scope="row"| Introducing My Friends, the Strangers 
| 
 Release date: April 6, 1970
 Label: Capitol
| 34
|-
! scope="row"| Getting to Know Merle Haggard's Strangers 
| 
 Release date: October 5, 1970
 Label: Capitol
| 44 
|-
! scope="row"| ''Honky Tonkin 
| 
 Release date: June 21, 1971
 Label: Capitol
| 34
|-
! scope="row"| Totally Instrumental with One Exception... 
| 
 Release date: May 1973
 Label: Capitol
| 23
|-
| colspan="5" style="font-size: 8pt"| "—" denotes releases that did not chart
|-
|}

Live albums

Compilation albums
{| class="wikitable plainrowheaders" style="text-align:center;"
|-
! rowspan="2" style="width:22em;"| Title
! rowspan="2" style="width:20em;"| Album details
! colspan="2"| Peak chartpositions
! rowspan="2"| Certifications/Sales
|- style="font-size:smaller;"
! width="45"| US Country
! width="45"| US
|-
! scope="row"| The Best of Merle Haggard
| 
 Release date: July 15, 1968
 Label: Capitol Records
| 3
| —
| 
 US: Platinum
|-
! scope="row"| Close-Up
| 
 Release date: 1969
 Label: Capitol Records
| 23
| —
| 
|-
! scope="row"| The Best of the Best
| 
 Release date: September 1972
 Label: Capitol Records
| 1
| 137
| 
 US: Platinum
|-
! scope="row"| Songs I'll Always Sing
| 
 Release date: April 11, 1977
 Label: Capitol Records
| 15
| —
| 
|-
! scope="row"| Eleven Winners
| 
 Release date: January 1978
 Label: Capitol Records
| 9
| —
| 
|-
! scope="row"| The Way It Was in '51
| 
 Release date: September 11, 1978
 Label: Capitol Records
| 30
| —
| 
|-
! scope="row"| Merle Haggard's Greatest Hits
| 
 Release date: 1982
 Label: MCA Records
| 37
| —
| 
|-
! scope="row"| His Epic Hits: The First 11 (To Be Continued...)
| 
 Release date: 1984
 Label: Epic Records
| 41
| —
| 
 US: Platinum
|-
! scope="row"| His Best
| 
 Release date: 1985
 Label: MCA Records
| 38
| —
| 
|-
! scope="row"| Walking the Line 
| 
 Release date: 1987
 Label: Epic
| 39
| —
| 
|-
! scope="row"| Greatest Hits of the 80's
| 
 Release date: October 5, 1990
 Label: Epic Records
| —
| —
| 
|-
! scope="row"| Super Hits
| 
 Release date: March 9, 1993
 Label: Epic Records
| —
| —
| 
|-
! scope="row"| Super Hits, Vol. 2
| 
 Release date: November 1, 1994
 Label: Epic Records
| —
| —
| 
 US: Gold
|-
! scope="row"| Super Hits, Vol. 3
| 
 Release date: September 5, 1995
 Label: Epic Records
| —
| —
| 
|-
! scope="row"| Down Every Road 1962–1994
|
 Release date: April 2, 1996
 Label: Capitol Nashville
| —
| —
| 
|-
! scope="row"| 16 Biggest Hits
| 
 Release date: July 14, 1998
 Label: Epic Records
| 55
| 167
| 
 US: Gold
|-
! scope="row"| For the Record, 43 Legendary Hits
| 
 Release date: August 24, 1999
 Label: BNA Records
| 38
| —
| 
 US: Gold
|-
! scope="row"| Cheatin| 
 Release date: September 25, 2001
 Label: Capitol Nashville
| —
| —
| 
|-
! scope="row"| Drinkin'''
| 
 Release date: September 25, 2001
 Label: Capitol Nashville
| —
| —
| 
|-
! scope="row"| Hurtin
| 
 Release date: September 25, 2001
 Label: Capitol Nashville
| —
| —
| 
|-
! scope="row"| Prison| 
 Release date: September 25, 2001
 Label: Capitol Nashville
| —
| —
| 
|-
! scope="row"| 20 Greatest Hits| 
 Release date: February 26, 2002
 Label: Capitol Nashville
| —
| 75
| 
US: 332,300
|-
! scope="row"| 40 #1's| 
 Release date: March 23, 2004
 Label: Capitol Nashville
| 60
| —
| 
|-
! scope="row"| 40 Greatest Hits, Vol. 1 (Rerecorded)| 
 Release date: May 25, 2004
 Label: Entertainment One Music
| —
| 88
| 
|-
! scope="row"| The Essential Merle Haggard: The Epic Years| 
 Release date: August 31, 2004
 Label: Epic Records
| —
| 139
| 
|-
! scope="row"| Hag: The Best of Merle Haggard| 
 Release date: September 12, 2006
 Label: Capitol Nashville
| 59
| —
| 
|-
! scope="row"| 10 Great Songs| 
 Release date: July 3, 2012
 Label: Capitol Nashville
| 75
| —
| 
|-
| colspan="5" style="font-size: 8pt"| "—" denotes releases that did not chart
|-
|}

 Other appearances 

 Production 

Singles

1960s

1970s

1980s—2010s

Other singles

Singles from collaboration albums

Guest singles

Charted B-sides

Music videos

Notes

A^ "Okie from Muskogee" also peaked at number 41 on the Billboard Hot 100. 
B^ "If We Make It Through December" also peaked at number 37 on the Canadian RPM'' Adult Contemporary Tracks chart. 
C^''' "Broken Friend" did not chart on Hot Country Songs, but peaked at No. 4 on Hot Country Radio Breakouts.

References

 
 
Country music discographies
Discographies of American artists